Kusal Maduranga (born 13 August 1993) is an actor in Sri Lankan theatre and television, who began his television career with his role in the television series, Paara Dige in 2021. He won the Most Popular Actor Award at Raigam Tele'es, in 2022.

Early  Life and Education
Maduranga was born on 13 August 1993, in Nuwara Eliya, and later moved to Horana. He was sent to Palannoruwa central College for Primary Education and Vidyarathna Pirivena in Horana for secondary education. He attended University of the Visual and Performing Arts for higher education.

Filmography

Theatre
{| class="wikitable plainrowheaders sortable" 
|-
!scope="col"| Year
!scope="col"| Title
!scope="col"| Role
!scope="col" class="unsortable" | Notes
!scope="col" class="unsortable" | 
|-
!scope=row|2017
|361
|
|
|style="text-align:center;"|
|-
!scope=row|2022
|Pem Yuwalak One Kara Thibe
|
|
|style="text-align:center;"|
|-
|}

Television
{| class="wikitable plainrowheaders sortable" 
|-
!scope="col"| Year
!scope="col"| Title
!scope="col"| Role
!scope="col" class="unsortable" | Notes
!scope="col" class="unsortable" | 
|-
!scope=row|2021
|Paara Dige
|"Banda" Bandara/Nishantha Bandara/Nilantha Bandara 
|One of the lead roles
|style="text-align:center;"|
|-
|}

Awards

Notes

References 

1993 births
Living people
People from  Central Province, Sri Lanka
21st-century Sri Lankan male actors